Manoranjitham Nagaraj is an Indian politician, was a chairman of Krishnagiri and was a member of the 14th Tamil Nadu Legislative Assembly from the Uthangarai constituency. She represented the All India Anna Dravida Munnetra Kazhagam party. She was re-elected in the elections of 2016.

References 

Tamil Nadu MLAs 2011–2016
All India Anna Dravida Munnetra Kazhagam politicians
Living people
21st-century Indian women politicians
21st-century Indian politicians
Year of birth missing (living people)
Tamil Nadu MLAs 2016–2021
Women members of the Tamil Nadu Legislative Assembly